Albanian Party of Democratic Reforms (in Albanian: Partia e Reformave Demokratike Shqiptare) is a political party in Albania led by Skender Halili.

PRDSH is part of the coalition Democratic Movement for Integration. Halili is the leader of the coalition.

References 

Political parties in Albania